Eadbald is an Anglo-Saxon male name, from the Old English words for rich and bold. It might refer to:

 King Eadbald of Kent, early 7th century
 Eadbald (bishop of London), late 8th century
 Bishop Eadbald of Lindsey, middle 9th century

See also
 Eanbald (disambiguation)